The 1982–83 Hellenic Football League season was the 30th in the history of the Hellenic Football League, a football competition in England.

Premier Division

The Premier Division featured twelve clubs which competed in the division last season, along with four new clubs.
Clubs promoted from Division One:
Abingdon United
Lambourn Sports
Clubs joined from the Gloucestershire County League:
Almondsbury Greenway 
Shortwood United

League table

Division One

Division One featured 13 clubs which competed in the division last season, along with three new clubs:
Kidlington, relegated from the Premier Division
Pegasus Juniors, joined from the Herefordshire Football League
Supermarine, joined from the Wiltshire League

League table

References

External links
 Hellenic Football League

1982-83
8